Yalçın Akdoğan (born 22 September 1969) is a Turkish politician who served as Deputy Prime Minister of Turkey from 2014 to 2016. A member of the ruling Justice and Development Party (AKP), Akdoğan became a Member of Parliament representing Ankara's first electoral district at the 2011 general election and was re-elected in June 2015. Prior to being elected Akdoğan was an academic and a journalist, having taught at the Bahçeşehir University and Anadolu University and written for Yeni Şafak and Star among others. He named Traditionalist authors René Guénon and Seyyed Hossein Nasr as his favourite writers.

Akdoğan was appointed as a Deputy Prime Minister in the Government of Ahmet Davutoğlu on 29 August 2014. He was responsible for the Solution process with Kurdish militants, designed to end the 40 years of conflict with Kurdish militants. He acted as the chief government negotiator during peace talks until they collapsed in 2015.

Early life and career
Akdoğan was born on 22 September 1969 in Üsküdar, İstanbul. He graduated from Anadolu University Faculty of Communications, where he had studied in the Department of Printing and Publishing. He served his compulsory military service in the Turkish Navy between 1991 and 1993. He received a master's degree in communication sciences from the same university and pursued a doctorate concerning political and social sciences at Marmara University, becoming a Docent in 2007.

Journalism
Akdoğan began his journalism career after receiving work experience at Milliyet, he was awarded for news reporting, research and studying as well as formatting during the Hürriyet Foundation Young Journalists competition in 1991. He has worked at Yeni Şafak, Star, İç Anadolu, Milli Gazete as well as numerous magazines such as Nehir and Yeni Zemin. He later served as the advisor responsible for the press for Ministers of State.

Early political career
Akdoğan served as the Director of Education, Culture and Public Relations at the Municipality of Pendik, a district in İstanbul. He became a member of the Justice and Development Party (AKP) and became an advisor for the party leader (at the time Recep Tayyip Erdoğan). He became a Member of Parliament representing Ankara's first electoral district at the 2011 general election and was re-elected in June 2015.

Chief Advisor to the Prime Minister
Akdoğan was well known for being one of the most influential contributors to shaping the Justice and Development Party's political ideology and outlook. He published his book Muhafazakâr Demokrasi (Conservative Democracy) in July 2004, discussing the AKP's declared ideological placement.

Deputy Prime Minister
Prime Minister Recep Tayyip Erdoğan was elected President in August 2014, after which serving Foreign Minister Ahmet Davutoğlu was elected as AKP leader soon after. In the new government led by Davutoğlu, Akdoğan was appointed as Deputy Prime Minister of Turkey, serving alongside Bülent Arınç, Ali Babacan and Numan Kurtulmuş. Akdoğan's close relations to Erdoğan fuelled speculation that Davutoğlu would take a submissive approach while Erdoğan continued to pursue his political agenda despite the Presidency being a largely ceremonial office. In the new cabinet, Akdoğan mainly focussed on the peace process with Kurdish  militants.

See also
 Peoples' Democratic Party
 Kurdish–Turkish conflict (1978–present)
 Conservative democracy

References

External links
 Profile on the Parliament website
 Collection of all relevant news items at Haberler.com
 Collection of all relevant news items at İnternet Haber

Justice and Development Party (Turkey) politicians
Academic staff of Marmara University
Living people
Anadolu University alumni
Academic staff of Anadolu University
Deputies of Ankara
1969 births
People from Üsküdar
Members of the 25th Parliament of Turkey
Members of the 24th Parliament of Turkey
Members of the 63rd government of Turkey
Marmara University alumni
Members of the 26th Parliament of Turkey
Members of the 64th government of Turkey
Deputy Prime Ministers of Turkey